React–Include–Recycle (R.I.R.) is a Portuguese political party led by Vitorino Silva, better known as Tino de Rans. The RIR presents itself as a humanist, pacifist, environmentalist, pro-European and universalist party with the purpose of bringing voters and elected officials closer, seeking to return the emphasis on public service to politics.

Election results

Assembly of the Republic

Regional Assemblies

References

External links 

Political parties in Portugal
Political parties established in 2019
Environmentalism in Portugal
Humanist parties
Pacifism in Portugal
Pro-European political parties in Portugal
Universalism